MS-Net, sometimes stylized as MS-NET, was an early network operating system sold by Microsoft during the earliest days of local area networking (LANs).

Overview
MS-Net was not a complete networking system of its own; Microsoft licensed it to vendors who used it as the basis for server programs that ran on MS-DOS, porting it to their own underlying networking hardware and adding services on top. Version 1.0 was announced on 14 August 1984 and released along with the PC/AT on 2 April 1985. A number of MS-Net products were sold during the late 1980s, before it was replaced by LAN Manager in 1990.

MS-Net's network interface was based on IBM's NetBIOS protocol definition, which allowed it to be ported to different networking systems with relative ease. It did not implement the entire NetBIOS protocol, however, only the small number of features required for the server role. One key feature that was not implemented was NetBIOS's name management routines, a feature 3rd parties often added back in. The system also supplied the program REDIR.EXE, which allowed transparent file access from DOS machines to any MS-Net based server.

Several products from the mid-to-late-1980s were based on the MS-Net system. IBM's PC-Net was a slightly modified version of the MS-Net system typically used with Token Ring. MS partnered with 3Com to produce the more widely used 3+Share system running on a 3Com networking stack based on the XNS protocol on Ethernet. Other well-known systems, including Banyan VINES and Novell NetWare, did not use MS-Net as their basis, using Unix and a custom OS, respectively. They did, however, allow access to their own files via the REDIR.EXE.

MS-Net was sold only for a short period of time. MS and 3Com collaborated on a replacement known as LAN Manager running on OS/2, using the new Server Message Block standard for file transfer. 3Com's version of the product retained their XNS-based protocol, but 3Com abandoned the server market not long after. MS's version remained based on NetBIOS and supported a number of underlying protocols and hardware. LAN Manager was itself replaced in 1993 by Windows NT 3.1.

See also

 Timeline of DOS operating systems
 net (command)

References
 "IBM PC and PC-Compatible NOSs Compared", U-M Computing News, Volume 2, Number 13 (1987), pp. 4–11.

Discontinued Microsoft operating systems
Network operating systems
Proprietary operating systems
Assembly language software
1985 software